The 2001 NCAA Division I Women's Lacrosse Championship was the 20th annual single-elimination tournament to determine the national champion of Division I NCAA women's college lacrosse. The championship game was played at Homewood Field in Baltimore, Maryland during May 2001. All NCAA Division I women's lacrosse programs were eligible for this championship. This year, the tournament field expanded from 12 to 16 teams, its current size.

Maryland defeated Georgetown, 14–13 after triple overtime, to win their ninth overall, and seventh consecutive, national championship. This was the last of Maryland's record seven straight national titles (1995–2001). With the win, the Terrapins also secured an undefeated season (23–0). 

For the third consecutive year, the leading scorer for the tournament was Jen Adams from Maryland (26 goals). Courtney Martinez, also from Maryland, was named the tournament's Most Outstanding Player.

Qualification

Tournament bracket

All-tournament team 
Erin Elbe, Georgetown
Caitlin McLean, Georgetown
Sheehan Stanwick, Georgetown
Suzanne Eyler, Loyola (MD)
Stacey Moriang, Loyola (MD)
Jen Adams, Maryland
Quinn Carney, Maryland
Kelly Coppedge, Maryland
Courtney Martinez, Maryland (Most outstanding player)
Tori Wellington, Maryland
Rachel Becker, Princeton
Jess Nelson, Princeton

See also 
 NCAA Division I Women's Lacrosse Championship
 NCAA Division II Women's Lacrosse Championship (began 2001)
 NCAA Division III Women's Lacrosse Championship
 2001 NCAA Division I Men's Lacrosse Championship

References

NCAA Division I Women's Lacrosse Championship
NCAA Division I Women's Lacrosse Championship
NCAA Women's Lacrosse Championship